Chen Qian may refer to:

 Chen Qian (Jin dynasty) (陳騫), courtesy name Xiuyuan, Jin dynasty military general
 Emperor Wen of Chen (522–566), named Chen Qian, emperor of the Chen dynasty
 Chen Qian (handballer) (born 1990), female Chinese handballer
 Chen Qian (pentathlete) (born 1987), female Chinese modern pentathlete
 Chen Qian (swimmer) (born 1993), female Chinese swimmer

See also
Qian Chen (professor), Chinese-American scientist